Raul Botelho (born 22 July 1957) is a Brazilian Lieutenant-Brigadier of the Brazilian Air Force, who has served as Chief of the Joint Staff of the Armed Forces of the Brazilian Armed Forces since 2019.

Military career
Joined the Air Force in 1973, being declared Aspirant in 1979. He was promoted to Brigadier in March 2007 and to Lieutenant-Brigadier in March 2015.

An aerial reconnaissance and search and rescue pilot, Botelho holds a Bachelor of Business Administration for the Mackenzie Presbyterian University and executive MBA in Administrative Management. He has 3,600 flight hours and flown various planes in the air force, such as the Aerotec Uirapuru, the Neiva Universal, the Embraer EMB 110 Bandeirante, the Lockheed C-130 Hercules, and the Embraer EMB 312 Tucano.

He commanded various units of the Air Force, such as the 1st squadron of the 6th Aviation Group, the 1st Air Force, the Third Regional Air Command, the COMGEP, and the Aeronautical Officers Promotion Commission, before becoming the Chief of Staff of the Air Force. He also became a military observer serving in Mozambique.

On January 15, 2019, President Jair Bolsonaro named him as the Chief of the Joint Staff of the Armed Forces of the Brazilian Armed Forces, replacing Admiral Ademir Sobrinho.

He left the command of the Joint Staff on 31 May 2021.

References

See also
 Brazilian Air Force
 Brazilian Armed Forces
 Joint Staff of the Armed Forces
 Ministry of Defence (Brazil)

1957 births
Brazilian Air Force personnel
Brazilian military personnel
Brazilian Air Force generals
Living people